

Winners and nominees

1980s

1990s

2000s

2010s

2020s

Records 
 Most awarded actress: Jacqueline Andere and Helena Rojo, 4 times.
 Most nominated actress: Helena Rojo with 8 nominations.
 Most nominated actress without a win: Ana Bertha Espín with 4 nominations.
 Youngest winner: Patricia Reyes Spíndola, 36 years old.
 Youngest nominee: Daniela Castro, 40 years old.
 Oldest winner: Silvia Pinal, 86 years old.
 Oldest nominee: Libertad Lamarque, 91 years old.
 Actresses that winning the award for the same role: Magda Guzmán (Tú o nadie, 1986) and Daniela Romo (Sortilegio, 2010)
 Actress winning after short time: Helena Rojo by (Mundo de fieras, 2007) and (Cuidado con el ángel, 2009), 2 years difference.
 Actress winning after long time: Magda Guzmán by (Tú o nadie, 1986) and (Para volver a amar, 2011), 25 years difference.
 Actresses winning this category, despite having been as a main villain:
 María Rubio (Cuna de lobos, 1987)
 Ofelia Guilmáin (Días sin luna, 1991)
 Claudia Islas (Corazón salvaje, 1994)
 Jacqueline Andere (Mi querida Isabel, 1998)
 Marga López (El Privilegio de Amar, 1999)
 Helena Rojo (Abrázame muy fuerte, 2001)
 Daniela Romo (El Manantial, 2002)
 Jacqueline Andere (La Otra, 2003)
 Helena Rojo (Mundo de fieras, 2007)
 Blanca Guerra (Abismo de pasión, 2013)
 Rosa María Bianchi (Yo no creo en los hombres, 2015)
 Actresses was nominated in this category, despite having played as a main villain:
 Surya MacGregor (Martín Garatuza, 1987)
 Martha Roth (El pecado de Oyuki, 1989)
 Susana Alexander (Susana Alexander, 1991)
 María Teresa Rivas (Agujetas de color de rosa, 1994)
 Angélica Aragón (Cañaveral de pasiones, 1997)
 Beatriz Aguirre (Sin pecado concebido, 2002)
 Silvia Pasquel (Amarte es mi pecado, 2004)
 Diana Bracho (Heridas de amor, 2007)
 Helena Rojo (Corazón salvaje, 2010)
 Daniela Castro (Mi pecado, 2010)
 Laura Zapata (Zacatillo, un lugar en tu corazón, 2011)
 Lucía Méndez (Esperanza del corazón, 2012)
 Ana Bertha Espín (La que no podía amar, 2012)
Foreign winning actress:
 Ofelia Guilmáin from Spain
 Irán Eory from Iran
 Marga López from Argentina
 Angélica María from United States
 Rosa María Bianchi from Argentina

References

External links 
TVyNovelas at esmas.com
TVyNovelas Awards at the univision.com

Leading
Leading
Leading
Television awards for Best Actress